Cowboys in Love is a studio recording released by the Western band Riders in the Sky, released in 1994. It was their only release on the Epic label.

Special guest Emmylou Harris duets with Ranger Doug on "One Has My Name (The Other Has My Heart)" and Asleep at the Wheel on "I'm a Ding Dong Daddy".

Track listing
 "The Cowboy's in Love" (Douglas Green) – 2:48
 "Along the Santa Fe Trail" (Edwina Coolidge, Al Dubin, Wilhelm Grosz) – 3:12
 "One Has My Name (The Other Has My Heart)" (Hal Blair, Eddie Dean, Lorene Dean) – 2:44
 "Wimmen...Who Needs 'Em" (Green) – 2:38
 "Sweet Señorita Teresa" (Paul) – 2:34
 "Farr Away Stomp (A Tribute to Our Four Legged Friends)" (Karl Farr, Hugh Farr) – 2:18
 "The Yellow Rose of Texas" – 3:01
 "La Malagueña" – 2:58
 "I'm a Ding Dong Daddy" (Green) – 3:20
 "Early Autumn" (Green) – 3:29
 "You're Wearin' Out Your Welcome, Matt" (David Kent, Joey Scott) – 3:02

Personnel
Douglas B. Green (a.k.a. Ranger Doug) – vocals, guitar
Paul Chrisman (a.k.a. Woody Paul) – vocals, fiddle
Fred LaBour (a.k.a. Too Slim) – vocals, bass
Emmylou Harris – harmony vocals
Gregg Galbraith – acoustic guitar, steel guitar
Tommy Wells – drums
Mark Howard – electric and acoustic guitar, mandolin
Joey Miskulin – organ, accordion
Dennis Burnside – string arrangements
Barbara Lamb – violin
Kenny Malone – percussion

Production notes
Produced by Joey Miskulin
Engineered by Gary Paczosa and Ed Simonton
Mastered by Denny Purcell
Editing by Don Cobb
Art Direction by Bill Johnson
Design by Jodi Lynn Miller
Photography by Frank Ockenfels

References

External links
Riders in the Sky Official Website

1994 albums
Riders in the Sky (band) albums
Epic Records albums